Omer Jusic (1942–2008) was a football player born in Banja Luka, Bosnia and Herzegovina. He played for FK Borac Banja Luka then in 1966 was transferred to FK Sloboda Tuzla where he finished his career in 1975. He was one of the top goal scorers in the history of the team and greatly contributed to Sloboda's placing first in their league and switching over to first league in 1969. He carried number "9" on his back the whole of his career. He coached numerous teams. He died of lung cancer in 2008. With 197 games played and 88 goals scored he is still top scorer for Sloboda Tuzla over 50 years since he played his last game.

1942 births
2008 deaths
Yugoslav footballers
FK Sloga Doboj players
FK Jedinstvo Brčko players
Deaths from lung cancer

Association footballers not categorized by position